Wyck Rissington is a village and civil parish in the picturesque Cotswold hills of Gloucestershire, England. The name 'Wyck Rissington' translates from the Saxon as "A building of special significance on a hill covered with brushwood".

Wyck is one of four Rissington villages along with Great, Little and Upper Rissington.

Local features and characteristics 

The village is spread out along a long central village green of about half a mile from end to end. It is regarded as being an unspoilt Cotswold village with a number of attractive traditional-style Cotswold stone dwellings. Other features of note include a duck pond and Victorian drinking fountain, both situated on the village green.

Stone House Garden is a notable local garden which is open to the public by appointment.

There is a village hall, which was built recently of traditional Cotswold stone and hosts a range of community events.

The long-distance Oxfordshire Way footpath runs through part of the village.

Church and rectory

The Church of St Laurence was built in the 12th century. It is a grade I listed building. In the early 1890s composer Gustav Holst, at the age of 17, was the resident organist for the church. The organ that Holst played is still in use.

Until 1984, a liturgical maze existed in the garden of the Rectory. This was built by Canon Harry Cheales, rector of the parish from 1947–1980. Once a year on St Lawrence's Day, 10 August, Canon Cheales would lead the congregation round the maze. Different points of the maze represented different Pilgrim Stations. At each station was a wood carving, twelve of which now decorate the chancel of the church. The design of the maze was such that each point could be visited without turning back. A mosaic plan of the maze is embedded in the wall of the church. The maze was dismantled when the rectory was sold on Canon Cheales' death.

There is currently an appeal to raise £120,000 for urgent repairs to the church which includes replacing part of its roofing and making the bells safe.

References 

Villages in Gloucestershire
Civil parishes in Gloucestershire
Cotswold District